Christopher Hugh Partridge (born 1961) is an author, editor, professor at Lancaster University, and founding Co-director of the Centre for the Study of Religion and Popular Culture.  According to Gordon Lynch, Partridge is a leading scholar of topics in popular culture.

Major works
The Encyclopedia of New Religions: New Religious Movements, Sects and Alternative Spiritualities (Lion Hudson Plc, 2006)
The Lure of the Dark Side: Satan & Western Demonology in Popular Culture (Equinox Publishing Ltd, SW11, 2008) 
The Re-Enchantment of the West: Alternative Spiritualities, Sacralization, Popular Culture and Occulture, Vol I and Vol II, (T. & T. Clark Publishers, 2006)
Dub in Babylon: The Emergence and Influence of Dub Reggae in Jamaica and Britain from King Tubby to Post-punk (Equinox Publishing, 2010)
The Lyre of Orpheus: Popular Music, the Sacred, and the Profane (Oxford University Press, 2013)
Mortality and Music: Popular Culture and the Awareness of Death (Bloomsbury, 2015)
High Culture: Drugs, Mysticism, and the Pursuit of Transcendence in the Modern World (Oxford University Press, 2018)

See also

 Satan in popular culture

References

External links
 Profile at Lancaster University

1961 births
Academics of Lancaster University
Alumni of the University of Aberdeen
Date of birth missing (living people)
Living people
Place of birth missing (living people)
Religion academics
Western esotericism scholars